The Alpha Kappa Rho International Fraternity and Sorority (ακρ or AKRHO) is a fraternity established in the Philippines in 1973. The fraternity, comprising men and women from different universities, was originally established to promote loyalty, unity and integrity in the Fraternity amongst its members. Nevertheless, it is now registered as an International Humanitarian Service Fraternity and Sorority which encourages members to be involved in humanitarian projects and service to others wherever it exists.
 
The fraternity is registered as "Alpha Kappa Rho International Humanitarian Service Fraternity  and Sorority Incorporated" with the Philippine Securities and Exchange Commissionwith over 3,000,000 member as a non-profit and non-dividend corporation. It was originally founded in the Philippines and claims to have chapters worldwide.

Foundation 

The Alpha Kappa Rho Fraternity and Sorority was founded on August 8, 1973, by sixteen college students of the University of Santo Tomas (UST). Except for the leader and elder of the group, Jose "Boy" Chua, who was enrolled at the UST College of Medicine, the 15 other founders were enrolled at the UST College of Commerce.
The Alpha Kappa Rho original founders are:
 Jose "Boy" Chua
 Teddy De Lara (Deceased)
 Edwin Solano (Deceased)
 Tanny Bernabe
 Obet Posadas
 Arnel Lorenzo
 James Bracewell (Deceased)
 Renato Go (Deceased)
 Philip Balangue
 Roger Sarmiento
 Ted Aves
 Monchet Cabrera
 Philip Diman
 Gil Villegas
 Mark Queyquep
 Noli Manalo(Deceased)

The Alpha Kappa Rho Sorority began in 1975 and the Sorority Founders are:
 Girlie Tesoro (Deceased)
 Joyce Gregorio
 Alda Altiveros Bernabe
 Marisa Cumuyog
 JJ Aquino (Deceased)
 Irene Ileto
 Grace Mendoza

The fraternity was founded on August 8 because it coincided with the Feast Day of St. Dominic, a university holiday at UST. UST is run by the Dominican Order also known as the Order of Preachers (OP).

Initiation rites 
Soon after the fraternity was established in 1973, it achieved notoriety in the Philippines because of fraternity wars and the alleged initiation rites that members had to undergo to join it. 

After the introduction of the Anti-Hazing Law by the Philippine Government in 1995, the fraternity initiation rites are no longer sanctioned or approved by the fraternity leadership.

Motto 
Its motto, "Vincit Omnia Veritas", meaning "Truth Conquers All" or "Truth Prevails", comes from the emblem of the University of Santo Tomas, where the fraternity was founded. Members are called "Skeptrons", a Greek word for the "ceremonial staff” or sceptre carried by a monarch as a symbol of sovereignty.

Merger 
The Alpha Kappa Rho Fraternity merged with the Omega Fraternity & Sorority International (OFSI) of San Sebastian College (SSC) and Zeta Upsilon Fraternity of the University of the East Recto campus (UE-Recto) in 1976. The RITUAL (Burn Mark which is a circular scar from a heated coin applied to the back of the member's right wrist) and the Hand Sign of AKRHO was originally from OFSI but became part of AKRHO after the merger agreement between AKRHO and OFSI. From 1976, the new RITUAL was required for all new members and the Hand Sign was to recognize AKRHO members.

NDM73 
5 out of the 16 Founders of Alpha Kappa Rho were alumni of Notre Dame of Greater Manila High School (NDM HS). Except Jose "Boy" Chua who graduated in 1972, the others belonged to NDM HS graduate of 1973. A number of other NDM 1973 graduates would also later join AKRHO.

Junior AKRHO 
In August 1975, AKRHO grew in numbers with the acceptance of high school students from UE-Recto into the fraternity. The first Junior AKRHO was Founded by Jun "Labo" Pasaporte, Rey Quitariano (another NDM alumni), and Noriel Arcadio at UE-Recto, Far Eastern University (FEU), Jose Rizal College High School (JRC), Philippine School of Business Administration (PSBA), and National College of Business and Arts (NCBA).

See also 
 List of fraternities and sororities in the Philippines
 Service fraternities and sororities

References 

 https://newsinfo.inquirer.net/430727/why-frats-survive-despite-hazing-ban
 https://dfa.gov.ph/dfa-news/news-from-our-foreign-service-postsupdate/23453-ph-consul-general-attends-alpha-kappa-rho-international-oathtaking-induction-in-macau
 http://www.officialgazette.gov.ph/2014/08/08/message-of-president-aquino-to-the-alpha-kappa-rho-toronto-chapter-on-the-occasion-of-their-41st-founding-anniversary-august-8-2014/

External links 
 

Student societies in the Philippines
Fraternities and sororities in the Philippines
Student organizations established in 1973
1973 establishments in the Philippines